Omari Caro (born 7 March 1991) is a former Jamaican international rugby league footballer who last played as a er for the London Skolars in League 1. Upon retiring from professional rugby, Omari is now a high school teacher.

He previously played for the London Broncos and the Hull Kingston Rovers in the Super League, the Bradford Bulls in the Championship, and as a loan player for the Gateshead Thunder in League 1.
 
Caro is known for his pace, having won "Super League's fastest man" in 2012, with a time of 10.28 seconds for 90 metres while carrying a ball.

Background
Caro was born in Hammersmith, London, England, and is of Jamaican descent through his father.

Career

Bradford Bulls

Caro joined the Bradford Bulls for the rest of the 2015 season.

2015 - 2015

He featured in Round 21 (Sheffield Eagles) to Round 23 (Halifax). Caro played in Qualifier 2 (Wakefield Trinity Wildcats) to Qualifier 5 (Hull Kingston Rovers) then in Qualifier 7 (Halifax). He scored against Leigh Centurions (3 tries), Halifax (1 try) and Widnes Vikings (1 try).

2016 - 2016

Caro featured in the pre-season friendlies against Leeds Rhinos and Castleford Tigers. He scored against Castleford Tigers (1 try).

Omari featured in Round 1 (Featherstone Rovers) to Round 4 (Leigh Centurions) then in Round 6 (Batley Bulldogs) to Round 16 (Dewsbury Rams). Caro played in Round 20 (Leigh Centurions) then in Round 22 (Oldham) to Round 23 (Featherstone Rovers). Caro played in the Challenge Cup in the 4th Round (Dewsbury Rams). He scored against Featherstone Rovers (3 tries), Swinton Lions (3 tries), Leigh Centurions (2 tries), Batley Bulldogs (1 try), Dewsbury Rams (3 tries, 3 goals), Sheffield Eagles (1 try), Workington Town (2 tries) and Oldham (5 tries). Midway through the season Caro signed an extension keeping him at the Bulls until 2017.

2017 - 2017

Caro resigned with the Bulls following the clubs liquidation at the end of the 2016 season.

He featured in the pre-season friendly against Huddersfield Giants.

Omari featured in Round 7 (Dewsbury Rams) to Round 12 (Toulouse Olympique) then in Round 16 (Dewsbury Rams) to Round 18 (Rochdale Hornets). Caro played in Round 23 (Swinton Lions). He featured in the Championship Shield Game 5 (Sheffield Eagles) to Game 7 (Rochdale Hornets). He scored against Dewsbury Rams (1 try, 1 goal), Featherstone Rovers (1 try), Sheffield Eagles (3 tries) and Rochdale Hornets (1 try, 1 goal).

Statistics do not include pre-season friendlies.

London Skolars
In December 2017 Caro signed for the London Skolars.

International career
In 2015, Caro played for Jamaica in their 2017 Rugby League World Cup qualifiers.
In 2017, Caro played for Jamaica in their test match against France.
In November 2018 Caro and his fellow Jamaican Reggae Warriors made history, achieving qualification for the first time to the Rugby League World Cup by beating Canada, 38-8 and then the US Hawks, 16-10. It was also Jamaica's first ever victory over the US in Rugby League.

References

External links

Bradford Bulls profile
Profile at londonbroncosrl.com
Harlequins reward homegrown trio with new contracts
Search for "Omari Caro" at bbc.co.uk

1991 births
Living people
Black British sportspeople
Bradford Bulls players
English people of Jamaican descent
English rugby league players
Hull Kingston Rovers players
Jamaica national rugby league team players
London Broncos players
London Skolars players
Newcastle Thunder players
People from Hammersmith
Rugby league centres
Rugby league players from London
Rugby league wingers
Schoolteachers from London